Udea accolalis is a species of moth in the family Crambidae described by Philipp Christoph Zeller in 1867. It is found in France, Switzerland, Italy, Austria, the Czech Republic, Slovakia, Hungary, Poland, Romania, Ukraine, Belarus, the Baltic region, Finland, Sweden and Russia.

The wingspan is 18–19 mm.

The larvae feed on Senecio vulgaris, Picris and Pulicaria dysenterica.

References

Moths described in 1867
accolalis
Moths of Europe